Eremophila resiliens is a low-growing shrub with deep reddish purple flowers, woolly hairy leaves and that is endemic to Western Australia. It grows on slopes and breakaways near Lake Carnegie.

Description
Its branches are grey with long, woolly hairs. The four stamens are enclosed in the petal tube. Flowering mainly occurs in August but also at other times after rainfall.

Taxonomy and naming 
This species was first formally described in 2016 by Bevan Buirchell and Andrew Phillip Brown in the journal Nuytsia from specimens collected west of Carnegie in 2010. The specific epithet (resiliens) is a Latin word meaning "springing back", referring to the species' ability to recover from drought.

Distribution and habitat
Eremophila resiliens is only known from a small area west of Carnegie where it grows in stony soil on slopes and breakaways in the Gascoyne biogeographic region.

Conservation
Eremophila resiliens is classified as "Priority One" by the Government of Western Australia Department of Parks and Wildlife, meaning that it is known from only one or a few locations which are potentially at risk.

References

Eudicots of Western Australia
resiliens
Endemic flora of Western Australia
Plants described in 2016
Taxa named by Bevan Buirchell
Taxa named by Andrew Phillip Brown